Grigorios Spandidakis (1909–1996) was a Hellenic Army officer who rose to the rank of Lieutenant General and the post of Chief of the Hellenic Army General Staff in 1965–1967. From this position, he was instrumental in the military preparations that resulted in the coup d'état of 21 April 1967 and the establishment of the Regime of the Colonels. He served as Deputy Prime Minister and Minister for National Defence in the first government of the new regime, but was dismissed after supporting the failed counter-coup attempt launched by King Constantine II on 13 December 1967. After the fall of the regime, he was tried and convicted to life imprisonment for his role in it. He secured an early release on health grounds and died in 1996.

Life 
Spandidakis was born in Rethymno, Cretan State, in 1909. He entered the Hellenic Army Academy, graduating on 5 August 1931 as a Cavalry Second Lieutenant. Promotions followed to lieutenant in 1935 and captain in 1938. Spandidakis fought in the Greco-Italian War, and was wounded during the German invasion of Greece. During the Axis Occupation of Greece, he participated in the Omiros resistance group, and in 1944 he fled to the Middle East and joined the elite Sacred Band of the Greek government in exile.

In 1946 he was promoted to Major and fought in the first operations of the Greek Civil War. In 1947 he was appointed as the first head of the new Armour School, a post he held until 1949. Promoted to lieutenant colonel in the same year, he was placed for a while as aide de camp to Marshal Alexandros Papagos, followed by command of the 391 Tank Regiment. During the 1950s he was posted in a succession of staff and command posts: Operations Officer of the First Army and of the National Defense General Staff, director of the 1st Staff Office of the NATO HQ in Izmir, CO of the II Tank Battle Command, director of the Army's Organization Bureau, director of the Armour Training Centre, and CO of the 20th Armoured Division and later of the I Army Corps. In the process he rose to Colonel (1955), Brigadier (1959), Major General (1961) and Lt. General (1964). On 9 October 1965, he was appointed Chief of the Hellenic Army General Staff. 

From this position, Spandidakis became the driving force behind the Army's plans to seize power in view of the ongoing political crisis in the country, under the codename IERAX II. The Army hierarchy, supported by King Constantine II, feared the growing influence of the left, particularly after the Apostasy of July 1965 and the rising anti-palace sentiment among the populace. Spandidakis promoted several officers who would later play a leading role in the coup d'état of 21 April 1967 to key positions; most notably the then-Lieutenant Colonel Georgios Papadopoulos. 

In early March 1967, in view of the oncoming legislative elections in May which the right-wing National Radical Union was widely expected to lose, preparations began for implementing the plan, and Spandidakis postponed a planned visit to the United States. Nevertheless, Spandidakis was caught by surprise by the outbreak of the military putsch of 21 April 1967, which the group of mid-level officers around Papadopoulos initiated without waiting for authorization by the King and the Army leadership. He was at first arrested by the putschists who replaced him with Odysseas Angelis, but quickly agreed to assist them. His acquiescence was a crucial factor in allowing the coup d'état to unfold smoothly: he used his authority to persuade the acting CO of the III Army Corps, Brigadier Orestis Vidalis, that the coup was sanctioned by the King, and prevented Vidalis' formation, the most powerful in the Hellenic Army, from descending upon Athens.

The putschists initially planned to name him Prime Minister, but were persuaded by the King to appoint a civilian, the judge Konstantinos Kollias, instead. In the new government, Spandidakis was thus appointed Deputy Prime Minister and Minister of National Defence. When King Constantine II tried to overthrow the junta on 13 December 1967, Spandidakis was on a NATO summit. He supported the failed attempt, and was dismissed from his offices.

After the fall of the junta in 1974, he was tried and condemned to life imprisonment for his role in the coup d'état, but released on grounds of ill health.

He died in Athens in 1996.

References

1909 births
1996 deaths
People from Rethymno
Hellenic Army lieutenant generals
Chiefs of the Hellenic Army General Staff
Deputy Prime Ministers of Greece
Greek Resistance members
Ministers of National Defence of Greece
Leaders of the Greek junta
Recipients of the Cross of Valour (Greece)
People convicted of treason against Greece